O-2390 (3,4-Dichloro-alpha-PVP, DCPVP) is a recreational designer drug from the substituted cathinone family, which acts as a potent inhibitor of dopamine and noradrenaline reuptake in vitro, with weaker but still significant inhibition of serotonin reuptake.

See also 
 3F-PVP
 4F-PVP
 4Cl-PVP
 3,4-DCMP
 Cilobamine
 Dichloropane
 LR-5182
 MDPV
 MFPVP
 Naphyrone
 Sertraline
 TH-PVP

References 

Pyrrolidinophenones
Designer drugs
Serotonin-norepinephrine-dopamine releasing agents